Zaker (also Romanized as Z̄āker; also known as Zakir) is a village in Bonab Rural District, in the Central District of Zanjan County, Zanjan Province, Iran. At the 2006 census, its population was 556, in 122 families.

References 

Populated places in Zanjan County